A historic site or heritage site is an official location where pieces of political, military, cultural, or social history have been preserved due to their cultural heritage value. Historic sites are usually protected by law, and many have been recognized with the official national historic site status. A historic site may be any building, landscape, site or structure that is of local, regional, or national significance. Usually this also means the site must be at least 50 years or older.

 
The U.S. National Park Service defines a historic site as the "location of a significant event, a prehistoric or historic occupation or activity, or a building or structure, whether standing, ruined, or vanished, where the location itself possesses historic, cultural, or archeological value regardless of the value of any existing structure".

Historic sites can also mark public crimes, such as Tuol Sleng Genocide Museum in Phnom Penh, Cambodia or Robben Island, South Africa. Similar to museums focused on public crimes, museums attached to memorials of public crimes often contain a history component, as is the case at the Oklahoma City National Memorial & Museum.

Historic site visitors
Historic sites and heritage sites are often maintained for members of the public to be able to visit. Visitors may come out of a sense of nostalgia for bygone eras, out of wishing to learn about their cultural heritage, or general interest in learning about the historical context of the site. Many sites offer guided tours for visitors, conducted by site staff who have been trained to offer an interpretation of life at the time the site represents. A site may also have a visitor center with more modern architecture and facilities, which serves as a gateway between the outside world and the historic site, and allows visitors to learn some of the historical aspects of the site without excessively exposing locations that may require delicate treatment.

See also 

Cultural property
Heritage centre
List of heritage registers
Memory space (social science)
National heritage site
World Heritage Site
National Historic Site of Canada
Listed building (United Kingdom)
National Historic Sites (United States)
Revolutionary Sites (North Korea)

References

Further reading

 
Types of museums